Michael Kelly  (born 1 November 1940) is a Scottish Labour politician and businessman. He graduated from the University of Strathclyde and became a lecturer in Economics there and a Labour councillor. From 1984 he was Managing Director of Michael Kelly Associates, a PR company. He held the position of Lord Provost of Glasgow from 1980 to 1984, and was Rector of the University of Glasgow from 1984 to 1987. As Lord Provost, he was instrumental in the city's adoption of the Glasgow's miles better campaign and slogan, which is credited with an important role in Glasgow's cultural renaissance during the 1980s. A member of one of the families that had controlled Celtic F.C. since its foundation, he sat on the club's board of directors until 1994, when the club reached the verge of bankruptcy and the much-criticised old regime was ousted by Fergus McCann's takeover.

Kelly is now a writer and PR consultant.

References 

1940 births
Living people
Scottish people of Irish descent
Scottish Labour councillors
Rectors of the University of Glasgow
Scottish writers
Scottish businesspeople
Scottish public relations people
Lord Provosts of Glasgow
Celtic F.C. directors and chairmen
Labour Party (UK) councillors
Directors of football clubs in Scotland
Commanders of the Order of the British Empire
Councillors in Glasgow